"Changing" is a pop song by Australian singer Conrad Sewell, written by Sewell, Jamie Hartman and Dave Gibson. It was released on 5 September 2018 as the lead single from his debut studio album, Life (2019). The song has peaked at number 91 on the Australian ARIA Singles Chart.

Background and release
Upon release Sewell said the song is an apology to an ex-girlfriend, telling never to change for anyone. He explains "I wrote it right in the middle of the relationship I was in when I started to realise that I was ruining it, and that my actions were starting to affect her. I would come home and see her crying. She was always upset. She wasn't the same person that she was when we first started dating. And I felt like it was because of me and the way I was acting."

Music video
The music video for "Changing" was directed by Matt Earl and released on 16 October 2018.

Reception
The Prelude Press described the song as "vulnerable and emotional".
Power FM described the song as "a stripped back ballad that shows the Aussie powerhouse's penchant for bold and masterful songwriting."

Charts

Release history

References 
 

2018 singles
2018 songs
Conrad Sewell songs
Songs written by Dave Gibson (Scottish singer-songwriter)
Songs written by Jamie Hartman
Songs written by Conrad Sewell
Sony Music Australia singles
Pop ballads